Johanna Bertha Julie Jenny Edle von Westphalen (12 February 18142 December 1881) was a German theatre critic and political activist. She married the philosopher and political economist Karl Marx in 1843.

Background
Jenny von Westphalen was born in the  small town of Salzwedel in Northern Germany to a fairly recently ennobled family that had been elevated into the petty nobility. Her father, Ludwig von Westphalen (1770–1842), was a civil servant and former widower with four previous children, who served as Regierungsrat (government councillor) in Salzwedel and in Trier. Her paternal grandfather , the son of a Blankenburg postmaster, had been ennobled in 1764 as Edler von Westphalen by Duke Ferdinand of Brunswick for his military services. He had served as the duke's de facto "chief of staff" during the Seven Years' War.

Her paternal grandmother, Jeanie Wishart (1742–1811), was a Scottish noble: her father, the Very Rev Dr George Wishart, (son of William Wishart Principal of Edinburgh University) a descendant of the 9th Earl of Angus, and the 3rd Earl of Marischal, the latter in turn a direct descendant of King James I, of the House of Stuart, while her mother Anne Campbell was the daughter of John Campbell (both a grandson of Sir James Campbell and of Sir Robert Campbell, grandson of Robert Sempill, 3rd Lord Sempill and John Stewart, 4th Earl of Atholl), heir of the Ardkinglas branch of the Clan Campbell, and part of the family of the Dukes of Argyll, who were for centuries Scotland's most powerful family. This would lead to an incident in 1854, when Karl Marx was arrested trying to pawn some of Jenny's Argyll silverware bearing the ducal insignia; the police suspected that a German refugee could not have acquired Argyll's property legally.

Her mother Carolina Heubel (1780–1856) was from a middle-class family, whose father was a retired military horse-care expert. Jenny von Westphalen's brother Edgar von Westphalen (1819–1890), was a schoolmate and friend of Karl Marx. Another brother, Ferdinand Otto Wilhelm Henning von Westphalen, was the conservative Interior Minister of Prussia, 1850–58. Although he was one of the leading conservative forces in 19th century Prussia, Ferdinand would remain on amiable terms with Karl and Jenny Marx.

Marriage
Jenny von Westphalen and Karl Heinrich Marx regularly met each other as children. She was four years older than Karl. They became close friends as teenagers. Both of them were well-read and literary, and they soon began courting. According to Marx, she was the most beautiful girl in the town of Trier. Her father, Ludwig von Westphalen, a friend of Marx's father, also befriended the teenage Marx, and would often go on walks with him, where they would discuss philosophy and English literature.  Jenny and Karl became engaged in 1836. They eventually married on 19 June 1843 in the Kreuznacher Pauluskirche (the Kreuznach church of Saint Paul), Bad Kreuznach.

Following their marriage, Karl and Jenny Marx moved to Rue Vaneau in Paris and befriended the German poet Heinrich Heine, who lived at Rue Matignon.

Children

Karl and Jenny Marx had the following seven children, in chronological order:

 Jenny Caroline  (1 May 1844 – 11 January 1883). Married Charles Longuet in 1872. She was a socialist activist. She wrote for the socialist press in France in the 1860s, most importantly in exposing British treatment of Fenian revolutionaries in Ireland. She died of bladder cancer, aged 38.
 Jenny Laura (26 September 1845 – 26 November 1911), born in Brussels, Belgium. Married Paul Lafargue in 1868. She was a socialist activist. Laura and her husband did decades of political work together, translating Marx's work into French, and spreading Marxism in France and Spain. She died in a suicide pact with her husband. She was 66.
 Charles Louis Henri Edgar (3 February 1847 in Brussels – 6 May 1855), Mush to family and friends, named for his uncle Edgar, the brother of Jenny von Westphalen. He died, aged 8.
 Henry Edward Guy (5 September 1849 – 19 November 1850), Guido to family and friends, born and died in London.
 Jenny Eveline Frances ("Franziska"; 28 March 1851 – 14 April 1852)
 Jenny Julia Eleanor (16 January 1855 – 31 March 1898), born in London. She was a socialist activist. She committed suicide at the age of 43 by poisoning herself with prussic acid after discovering that her long-term partner Edward Aveling secretly married a young actress named Eva Frye in June 1897.
  An unnamed child, born and died 6 July 1857 in London.

Exile

In 1844, Jenny travelled alone with her baby Jennychen to visit her mother. In 1845, the French political police expelled Karl Marx and the pregnant Jenny; thus the birth of Laura took place in Brussels.

In 1848, the Brussels police detained Jenny and served an anti-immigrant deportation order. The Marxes returned to Paris and then moved to Cologne.

Revolutionary upsurges took place in many European countries in 1848, including the German states. It was the time of the Communist Manifesto. The Prussian authorities had Karl Marx deported to France. He then left with his family for London in England.

Around 1849–1850, the Marxes lived at Dean Street in London. In 1856 the Marxes moved to Grafton Terrace, near Hampstead Hill in London, thanks to the money given to Jenny by her mother when she died (1856). 9 Grafton Terrace, then at the outskirts of "civilised" London, had a small garden and two floors with seven rooms, including the kitchen. Philosopher Leszek Kołakowski wrote of the Marx family's time in London: "[Karl] Marx was notoriously incapable of keeping accounts, and Jenny was a regular customer of the London pawnbrokers."

Death
In later years Jenny Marx suffered from internal pains, diagnosed as liver cancer. Following a family visit to France, she died in London at the age of 67 on 2 December 1881. She was buried in Highgate Cemetery, London, as was Karl Marx. In 1954, her remains were transferred, along with those of her husband and other family members, to a new grave, over which a memorial was constructed.

Works
 Short Sketch of an Eventful Life (1865–1866)
 Aus der Londoner Theaterwelt. In: Frankfurter Zeitung und Handelsblatt, Frankfurt am Main, No. 328, 21 November 1875
 Londoner Saison. In: Frankfurter Zeitung und Handelsblatt, Frankfurt am Main, No. 95, 4 April 1876
 Englische Shakespeare-Studien. In: Frankfurter Zeitung und Handelsblatt, Frankfurt am Main, No. 3, 3 January 1877
 Shakespeares "Richard III" im Londoner Lyceum-Theater. In: Frankfurter Zeitung und Handelsblatt, Frankfurt am Main, No. 39, 8 February 1877
 Vom Londoner Theater. In: Frankfurter Zeitung und Handelsblatt, Frankfurt am Main, No. 145, 25 May 1877
 Die hervorragendesten Persönlichkeiten der englischen Salonwelt. In: Der Sprudel. Allgemeines deutsches Bade-Journal, Wien, IX. Jg., No. 3, 18 May 1879
 Irving at home. In: Der Sprudel. Allgemeines deutsches Bade-Journal, Wien, IX. Jg., No. 7, 23 June 1879

Citations

General and cited references 

 Boris Nikolajewski: Jenny Marx. Ein Lebensabriß. Dietz, Berlin 1931.
 Otto Mänchen-Helfen, Otto / Boris Nikolajewski: Karl und Jenny Marx. Ein Lebensweg. Verlag der Bücherkreis, Berlin 1933.
 Bert Andréas: Briefe und Dokumente der Familie Marx aus den Jahren 1862–1873 nebst zwei unbekannten Aufsätzen von Friedrich Engels. In: Archiv für Sozialgeschichte. 2. Bd. Verlag für Literatur und Zeitgeschehen, Hannover 1962.
 Mohr und General. Erinnerungen an Marx und Engels. 2. durchges. Aufl. Dietz Verlag, Berlin 1965.
 Bruno Kaiser: Jenny Marx als Theaterkritikerin. Zu einer bedeutsamen Wiederentdeckung. In: Beiträge zur Geschichte der Arbeiterbewegung. Berlin 1966, Heft 6, S. 1031–1042.
 Jürgen Reetz: Vier Briefe von Jenny Marx aus den Jahren 1856-1860. Trier 1970. (Schriften aus dem Karl-Marx-Haus Trier Heft 3)
 Emile Bottigelli: Sieben unveröffentlichte Dokumente von Friedrich Engels. In: Friedrich Engels. 1820–1870. Referate Diskussionen Dokumente. Redaktion: Hans Pelger. Verlag für Literatur und Zeitgeschehen, Hannover 1971, S. 319–325
 Johann Ludwig Graf Schwerin von Krosigk: Jenny Marx. Liebe und Leid im Schatten von Karl Marx. Eine Biographie nach Briefen, Tagebüchern und anderen Dokumenten. Staatsverl, Wuppertal 1975, .
 Heinrich Gemkow: Neu aufgefundene Briefe von Karl und Jenny Marx. In: Beiträge zur Geschichte der Arbeiterbewegung. Berlin 1976, Heft 6, S. 1028 ff.
 Ingrid Donner, Birgit Matthies: Jenny Marx über das Robert-Blum-Meeting am 9 November 1852 in London. In: Beiträge zur Marx-Engels-Forschung. 4, Berlin 1978, S. 69–78.
Luise Dornemann: Jenny Marx: Der Lebensweg einer Sozialistin. Dietz, Berlin 1980.
 Heinrich Gemkow: Erbschaftsverzichterklärung von Jenny Marx. In: Beiträge zur Geschichte der Arbeiterbewegung. 22.Jg. Berlin 1980, Heft 1, S. 59–62.
 H. F. Peters: Die rote Jenny. Ein Leben mit Karl Marx. Kindler, München 1984, .
 „Sie können sich denken, wie mir oft zu Muthe war...“. Jenny Marx in Briefen an eine vertraute Freundin. Hrsg. von Wolfgang Schröder. Verlag für die Frau, Leipzig 1989.
 Jenny Marx. Ein bewegtes Leben. Zusammengestellt und eingeleitet von Renate Schack. Illustrationen von Erika Baarmann. Dietz Verlag,  Berlin 1989.
 Manfred Kliem: Neue Presseveröffentlichungen von Jenny Marx über William Shakespeare und Henry Irving im "Sprudel" von 1879 entdeckt. In: Beiträge zur Marx-Engels-Forschung 28, Berlin 1989, S. 198–216.
 Boris Rudjak: Eine erstaunliche Verwechslung. In: Marx-Engels-Forschungsberichte 6. Karl-Marx-Universität Leipzig, Leipzig 1990, S. 159–164.
 Heinz Monz: Zwei Briefe aus Niederbronn (Elsaß). In: Kurtrierisches Jahrbuch. 30.Jg.  Trier 1990, S. 237–252.
 Galina Golovina, Martin Hundt: Jenny Marx als "Geschäftsführer". Eine neue Quelle zu Marx' Mitarbeit an der New-York Tribune. In: MEGA Studien. 1996/2, Dietz Verlag, Berlin 1997, S. 109–112.
 Angelika Limmroth: Jenny von Westphalen—Die Frau von Karl Marx. 3. veränd. u. überarb. Aufl. Großbodungen 2006, . (Bodunger Beiträge, H. 6)
 Jörn Schütrumpf (Hrsg.): Jenny Marx oder: Die Suche nach dem aufrechten Gang. Karl Dietz Verlag Berlin, Berlin 2008, .
 Angelika Limmroth: Jenny Marx. Die Biografie. Karl Dietz Verlag, Berlin 2014,  
 Rolf Hecker, Angelika Limmroth (Hrsg.): Jenny Marx. Die Briefe. Karl Dietz Verlag, Berlin 2014,  329 letters are printed here, most of them published for the first time.

External links

 Jenny Von Westphalen-Marx Correspondence Page at the Marxists Internet Archive

1814 births
1881 deaths
Deaths from cancer in England
Deaths from liver cancer
German expatriates in the United Kingdom
German people of Scottish descent
German untitled nobility
Karl Marx
People from Salzwedel
People from the Province of Saxony
Von Westphalen family